Cuproxena platuncus is a species of moth of the family Tortricidae. It is found in Peru.

The wingspan is 22 mm. The ground colour of the forewings is cream, with indistinct brownish admixture and dispersed brown scales. The hindwings are cream.

Etymology
The species name refers to the structure of the uncus and is derived from Greek platys (meaning flat).

References

Moths described in 2010
Cuproxena
Moths of South America
Taxa named by Józef Razowski